Rugulovasines are bio-active alkaloids made by Penicillium. Rugulovasine A and B bind strongly to the 5-HT1A, 5-HT2A, and 5-HT2C receptors, but lack meaningful binding affinity towards the α1 adrenergic and  dopamine receptors.  Little is known about the in vivo activity of Rugulovasine A and B, although they have hypotensive effects in cats.

References

Tryptamine alkaloids

Rugulovasine